Assunta Scutto (born 17 January 2002) is an Italian judoka.

She won bronze medal at the 2022 World Judo Championships.

References

External links
 
 
 

2002 births
Living people
Italian female judoka
21st-century Italian women